Wojciech Rodek is a Polish conductor. He is artistic director of the Lublin Philharmonic in Lublin, the ninth largest city in Poland.

Rodek was born in 1977 in Brzeg, Poland. He began studying piano at the age of 8. Rodek studied conducting from 1998 to 2003 at the Music Academy in Wroclaw, Poland.

In 2005 he won the competition for the position of Assistant Conductor of the National Philharmonic Orchestra in Warsaw. Since then, he has worked with the National Philharmonic Orchestra, the Polish National Radio Symphony Orchestra in Katowice, and the Sinfonia Varsovia.

He is a regular guest conductor, conducting opera orchestras in major concert halls of Europe.

In December, 2011, Wojciech Rodek was appointed artistic director of the Lublin Philharmonic. "Rodek is one of two or three most talented conductors of the younger generation" said John Sek, chief executive of the Philharmonic.

Discography
Rodek conducts the Sinfonia Varsovia in a recording of Cello Concerto No. 1, Op. 107 in E-flat major by Dmitry Shostakovich, Cello Heroics II: Shostakovich, featuring Gavriel Lipkind, cello

Cinema
Rodek is credited as conductor for:
 Get Low (2009), starring Robert Duvall, Bill Murray and Sissy Spacek
 City Island (2009), starring Andy Garcia, Julianna Margulies and Steven Strait

References

1977 births
Polish conductors (music)
Male conductors (music)
Living people
21st-century conductors (music)
21st-century male musicians